Matskevich is a Belarusian surname derived from the name Maciek, a diminutive of Maciej (Matthew).  Other forms include the Lithuanian Mackevičius and Polish Mackiewicz. Notable people with this surname include:

Ivan Matskevich,  Belarusian handball playe
Ivan Matskevich (actor) (b. 1947), a Soviet and Belarusian film and theater actor
Uladzimir Matskevich (b. 1956), a Belarusian philosopher and political writer
Vladimir Matskevich (1909–1998), a Soviet Deputy Premier
, chairman of  the Belarusian State Security Committee (1995–2000)

Belarusian-language surnames